Tells Peak is a mountain in the Sierra Nevada at the very north end of the Crystal Range (California), to the west of Lake Tahoe.  It is located in the Desolation Wilderness in El Dorado County, California.

The origin of the name is not certain. It is probably named for a Swiss homesteader named Tell who lived a few miles to the west. At least one historian believes it was named for Ciperano Pedrini, a storekeeper in Garden Valley, who was known as Bill Tell.

References

External links 
 

Mountains of El Dorado County, California
Lake Tahoe
Mountains of the Desolation Wilderness
Mountains of Northern California